Harmony Day is celebrated annually on 21 March in Australia. It is a government-declared observance day that began in 1999, coinciding with the United Nations International Day for the Elimination of Racial Discrimination.

Overview 
Harmony Day is typically marked by community events and local activities, centered around the theme of equality and social justice. The message of Harmony Day is social cohesion and racial harmony and is expressed through community participation, inclusiveness, the celebration of diversity, respect, belonging, and primarily the unity and togetherness from the numerous nationalities residing within the community. The designated colour representing Harmony Day is orange; a colour symbolic of peace and diversity in society. Because it's associated with optimism and energy, many brands use orange to convey a message of positivity. If you're looking to get your audience excited about something, go for orange. It's an attention-grabbing, warm color that really pops when combined with cool blue or green tones.

Origins 
The day was introduced by the Howard government to promote a singular and unifying notion of Australian-ness within multicultural policy. In 1998, Australian Prime Minister John Howard (Liberal-National Coalition) commissioned the Eureka Research to begin an anti-racism study to "explore and understand the subtleties and nature of racism in the Australia of the late 1990s, with a view to mounting an effective mass media and/or education anti-racism campaign". Among the conclusions of the study were that there was a need for an anti-racism campaign and a promotion of 'living in harmony'.

According to multiple media reports, the outcomes of the research were not aligned with Howard's views that Australians were not racist. Commenting on the racially motivated 2005 Cronulla riots, he stated: "I do not accept that there is underlying racism in this country." There with, the Howard government focused on the second part of the research and developed Harmony Day. The Eureka report was suppressed from public access until 2011.

Diversity 
The Diversity and Social Cohesion Program has two elements: Community Grants and Harmony Day.
The Diversity Cohesion Program provides funding, education and information to help organisations create a spirit of inclusiveness, and to ensure all Australians are treated fairly regardless of their cultural background or circumstance.

Reactions

Criticism of Harmony Day has focused on the multi-cultural aspect of the day and the shift in focus away from anti-racism.

Shift in focus from anti-racism

Emeritus professor Andrew Jakubowicz was critical of the 13-year governmental suppression of the original Eureka study, and the subsequent lack of research or focus on attempts to eliminate racism.

Indigenous critics like Indigenous X CEO and founder Luke Pearson argue that while Harmony Day is perceived as a positive contribution to a multicultural society, the day does little to provide practical solutions to racial discrimination.

Anti-racism groups have highlighted media coverage at the time Harmony Day was introduced that proposed the Australian government was not doing enough to eliminate racism. Not-for-profit group All Together Now have questioned why Harmony Day was needed at all if there was no racism in Australia, describing the creation of the day as "Orwellian". The Secretary for the New South Wales Fabians, a left-wing think tank, argued that the day dilutes the UN marked event of its intended meaning and that it avoids discussion of the structural barriers of racial discrimination.

Multiculturalism criticism

Commercial and technology lawyer Dan Ryan, writing in The Australian in 2011, criticized Harmony Day, likening it to government projects in China. He said that events like Harmony Day are aimed at oppression of liberties in China, and are therefore impossible to achieve in a democratic country such as Australia. 
The problem with the harmonious society is not just the disconnect between the rhetoric and the reality. The truth is, while superficially sweet-sounding, the idea is illusory and Utopian. We may all wish in the abstract that everyone got along, but the reality is that free societies by their nature are cacophonous, argumentative and full of dissent."

He also said that multiculturalism was being whitewashed by the government and media.
If it is decided that we must restrict speech or avoid discussing certain subjects to keep the peace over an apparently combustible population, might now not be the time to ask whether this type of harmony is worth celebrating?"

Grette Toner, in an Australian Curriculum Studies Association paper titled "Beyond Harmony: Rethinking Intercultural Learning for Australian Primary Schools", visited a primary school and said the day's activities were "largely symbolic...difficult to gauge what students learned". She criticized the school for not involving anybody from outside of it.

References

External links
 Harmony Day official website

Multiculturalism in Australia
March observances
Anti-discrimination law in Australia